Dietrich Erdmann (20 July 1917 – 22 April 2009) was a German composer and University lecturer.

Life 
Erdmann was born in Bonn. His father was the publicist and trade union official Lothar Erdmann, his mother Elisabeth Erdmann-Macke, the painter August Macke's widow . Erdmann had lived in Berlin since he was eight years old. His childhood was characterised by a family environment with a strong cultural interest.

He received his first piano lessons at the age of nine. Already during his school days at the Humanistisches Gymnasium In Berlin, he paid visites to the composers Paul Hindemith, Ernst-Lothar von Knorr and Harald Genzmer.

In 1931, he began his cello lessons with Pál Hermann. From 1934 to 1938, Erdmann studied choir conducting and musical composition with Kurt Thomas and conducting with Walter Gmeindl at the Universität der Künste Berlin.
Erdmann was co-founder of the Arbeitskreis für Neue Musik at the Berlin University of the Arts.

He then was appointed associate professor in 1954. 12 years later, he became Ordinarius and in 1970 finally prorector of the college. He retired in 1982.

Erdmann was married to Gisela Cludius from 1940 to 1946, to Bianca Kuron from 1949 to 1958 and to Gertrud Schulz from 1959.

Erdmann died in Berlin at the age of 91.

Activities 
Erdmann's work encompasses a wide variety of instrumentations and almost all types of musical form: 16 Solo concerts, 12 pieces for Grand Orchestras, piano music, solo- and chamber music for Strings and wind instruments as well as Lieder, cantata and Choir music.
In addition, Erdmann also composed numerous  (music for plucked instruments)  works.

Awards 
 Order of Merit of the Federal Republic of Germany am Bande (15 January 1987).
 1988: .
 1990: Honorary member of the 
 1993: Honorary Chairman of the Deutscher Tonkünstlerverband Berlin
 1998: Humboldt-Plaketten.
 2002: .

Work 
 1946: Der Maien for soprano, choir, flute and string quartet
 1956: Concertino for piano and small orchestra
 1965: Sonata for oboe and piano
 1971: Dialoghi for Violoncello and piano
 1979: Mandolin Concerto
 1982–1983: Prisma for viola and piano
 1984: Resonanzen for Saxophone-Quartet
 1986: Concertino for viola (or English horn or clarinet) and ensemble of plucked instruments
 1990: Double Concerto for bassoon, contrabassoon and orchestra

Further reading 
 Nico Schüler. "Art. Erdmann, Dietrich," In: MGG Online, ed. by Laurenz Lütteken. Kassel, Stuttgart, New York: Bärenreiter. 2016.
 Nico Schüler. "Dietrich Erdmann," in: Komponisten der Gegenwart. ed. by Hanns-Werner Heister & Walter-Wolfgang Sparrer, 39. Nachlieferung. Munich: edition text+kritik, 2009. 2 S.
 Adelheid Krause-Pichler and Nico Schüler (Eds.): Die Gleichheit von Neu oder Alt. Dietrich Erdmann - Leben und Werk. Freiburg: ConBrio, 1997. ISBN 978-3930079933.
 Riemann Musiklexikon. Ergänzungsband A–K. Schott, Mainz 1972, .
 Henke Matthias: Das große Buch der Zupforchester. Schwingenstein, Munich 1987. .
 Wilfried Bruchhäuser: Komponisten der Gegenwart. Deutscher Komponistenverband, Berlin 1985. 
 S. Beikler, R. Grambow: Ein Neoklassizist ist von uns gegangen. Concertino 3/2009. 
 Musik eine verbindende Kunst. Concertino 3/2009.

Recording 
 Werke für Zupforchester. Mühlheimer Zupforchester (Ltg. Detlef Tewes). Telos music records, 2002

References

External links 
 
 

20th-century German composers
Recipients of the Cross of the Order of Merit of the Federal Republic of Germany
1917 births
2009 deaths
Musicians from Bonn